Legislative elections were held in Kazakhstan on 19 September and 3 October 2004. The Otan party won 42 of the 77 seats, gaining a majority in the Mazhilis.

Background
By 2003 the Kazakh economy was on a recovery with its GDP growth rate being 9.2% which was one of the highest rates among the CIS countries. The primary cause was due to the increased cost of petroleum as a result of the American-led war in Afghanistan, which allowed the government to repay its debts and raise pensions, average salaries and improve medical services. The quality of life in Kazakhstan was improving, as the average monthly salaries increased to about 28,000 Tenge ($198) or about 8.3% increase from 2002. This increase however was not spread evenly. Some groups benefited greatly from the increasing wages, while about 25% of Kazakhs especially in the southwestern districts and regions around the Caspian Sea continued to live below the poverty line.

Despite improvements in the economy and social issues, Kazakhstan faced problems with the lack of independent media, a poor human rights record and the unfair treatment of independent journalists, including the case of Sergei Duvanov who was arrested in October 2002, a few days before his travel to the United States to discuss corruption and the situation with the Kazakh medi, when he was accused of sexually assaulting a minor. Due to international pressure, including from American Secretary of State Colin Powell, Duvanov was released in January 2004.

In the years leading up to the elections, political parties had been significantly weakened. The process of re-registration of parties in spring 2003 particularly affected the opposition due to a law that raised the minimum number of members for parties to be able to register to 50,000. Several opposition parties were unable to meet this requirement.

Results

References

External links
Media bias mars Kazakhstan's election campaign
CNN.com Election Watch

Kazakhstan
Legislative election
Elections in Kazakhstan